The 1986 Holiday Bowl was a college football bowl game played December 30, 1986, in San Diego, California. It was part of the 1986 NCAA Division I-A football season. It featured the 19th-ranked Iowa Hawkeyes, and the unranked San Diego State Aztecs.

Scoring summary
Iowa scored first on a 5-yard touchdown run from Rick Bayless, taking a 7–0 lead. San Diego State answered on a 6-yard touchdown pass from Todd Santos to running back Chris Hardy to make it 7–6 Iowa, closing the 1st quarter of scoring. In the second quarter, Santos fired a 44-yard bomb to Matt Jakson, as SDSU took a 14–7 lead. Iowa's Mark Vlasic scored from 1 yard out, and SDSU led 14–13. Todd Santos threw a 28-yard touchdown pass to Monty Gilbreath, giving San Diego State a 21–13 lead at halftime.

In the third quarter, Gilmore scored on a 1-yard touchdown run to make it 28–13 SDSU. Iowa responded when Hudson scored on a 1-yard touchdown run, making it 28–21 SDSU. In the fourth quarter, Chris Hardy scored on a 6-yard run, and SDSU went up 35–21. Iowa responded with a 29-yard touchdown pass from Vlasic to Cook, making it 35–29. Iowa then took the lead on a 4-yard score from Vlasic to Flagg.

San Diego State's kicker Kevin Rahill kicked a 21-yard field goal with 47 seconds left to put the Aztecs up 38–36. Iowa's Kevin Harmon returned the ensuing kickoff 48 yards to the SDSU 37-yard line. Iowa kicker Rob Houghtlin kicked a 41-yard field goal, as Iowa won 39–38.

References

Holiday Bowl
Holiday Bowl
Iowa Hawkeyes football bowl games
San Diego State Aztecs football bowl games
December 1986 sports events in the United States
Holiday Bowl
1980s in San Diego